Steve Fallone is a New York-based mastering engineer. He won at the 64th Annual Grammy Awards for his work on Love For Sale.

References

Living people
Grammy Award winners
Year of birth missing (living people)